The 2022 Southland Conference baseball tournament will be held from May 19 through 21 and May 26 to 28.  The top eight regular season finishers of the league's thirteen teams will meet in the double-elimination tournament.  The first round will be held at the home fields of the top two seeds, while the finals will be held at the home field of the top remaining seed.  The winner of the tournament will earn the conference's automatic bid to the 2022 NCAA Division I baseball tournament.

Seeding and format
The top eight finishers from the regular season will be seeded one through eight.  They will play a two bracket, double-elimination tournament, with the winners of each bracket meeting in a best of three series.  The top two seeds will each host a bracket, and the championship series will be held at the home field of the highest remaining seed on the following weekend.

Results

References

Tournament
Southland Conference Baseball Tournament